Estadio Goyenola (Estadio Ingeniero Raúl Goyenola) is a multi-use stadium in Tacuarembó, Uruguay.  It is currently used mostly for football matches and is the home stadium of Tacuarembó FC.  The stadium holds 12,000 people and was built in 1955.

References

Sports venues completed in 1955
Goyenola
Goyenola
Buildings and structures in Tacuarembó Department
Tacuarembó F.C.
1955 establishments in Uruguay
Sport in Tacuarembó Department